In What Language? is a collaborative studio album by American jazz pianist Vijay Iyer and American hip hop musician Mike Ladd. It was released on Pi Recordings in 2003.

Critical reception

Joe Tangari of Pitchfork gave the album an 8.3 out of 10, writing, "What might make In What Language? truly important ... is that it's focused intently on probing social issues in meaningful ways." Chris Nickson of AllMusic gave the album 4 out of 5 stars, commenting that "Written originally to be performed on-stage in a theatrical setting, it transfers well to a purely recorded medium, dense and demanding, but ultimately satisfying, inasmuch as it leaves the listener full of questions and less certain about the world." Lyn Horton of All About Jazz stated that "These composers have instituted a new paradigm for 21st century opera." Anastasia Tsioulcas of Billboard wrote, "With Iyer working as composer and Ladd as librettist, the two weave together elements of jazz, hip-hop and spoken-word art into a new, subversive kind of song cycle."

Track listing

Personnel
Credits adapted from liner notes.

 Vijay Iyer – piano, keyboards, electronics, production, mixing, liner notes
 Mike Ladd – vocals (1, 2, 3, 9, 12, 16, 17), electronics, production, mixing, liner notes, photography
 Latasha N. Nevada Diggs – vocals (2, 5, 8, 13), electronics (13)
 Allison Easter – vocals (2, 6, 11, 13, 15)
 Ajay Naidu – vocals (4, 7, 10, 14)
 Rudresh Mahanthappa – alto saxophone
 Ambrose Akinmusire – trumpet
 Dana Leong – cello, flugelhorn, trombone
 Liberty Ellman – guitar
 Stephan Crump – double bass
 Trevor Holder – drums
 Scotty Hard – production

References

External links
 

2003 albums
Collaborative albums
Vijay Iyer albums
Mike Ladd albums
Pi Recordings albums